Alonzo King, born in Georgia to civil-rights activists Slater King and Valencia King Nelson, is an American dancer and choreographer based in San Francisco.  King grew up in Georgia and California, and, as an adult, decided his contribution would be teaching and choreography. In 1982, having established himself as a well-respected teacher, he founded Alonzo King LINES Ballet. Believing that everyone has the potential to grow through dance, seven years later he opened what was then known as the San Francisco Dance Center, offering classes for both professionals and the community.

Alonzo holds Honorary Doctorate Degrees from The Juilliard School, California Institute of the Arts, and Dominican University of California.

Alonzo King LINES Ballet 
In 1982, upon relocating back to California, King founded Alonzo King LINES Ballet, which premiered at the San Francisco State's McKenna Theater. Sharing his choreography around the world, LINES Ballet performs bi-annual home seasons at the Yerba Buena Center for the Arts in San Francisco, and also maintains an international touring schedule including a recent set of performances in Hong Kong of The Propelled Heart in September 2017.

Awards and recognition 
King is the recipient of numerous awards including an NEA choreographic fellowship, San Francisco Mayor's Award, a Jacob's Pillow Creativity Award, and Kennedy Center Master of Choreography which was awarded in 2005. In 2020, he was one of five honorees of the Dance Magazine Awards.
In addition to his work for LINES Ballet, King's choreography is also in the repertoire of other dance companies including The Royal Swedish Ballet, Ballet Frankfurt, Ballet Béjart, Les Ballets de Monte-Carlo, Joffrey Ballet, Alvin Ailey American Dance Theater, Hong Kong Ballet, North Carolina Dance Theatre, and Hubbard Street Dance Chicago.

Selected works 
 2013: Meyer
 2012: AZIMUTH, Constellation
 2011: Resin, Figures of Thought
 2010: Writing Ground, Wheel in the Middle of the Field
 2009: Scheherazade, Refraction, Dust and Light
 2008: The Radius of Convergence, The Steady Articulation of Perseverance
 2007: Rasa, Irregular Pearl, Long River, High Sky
 2006: Sky Clad, Migration
 2005: The Moroccan Project, Handel, Salt, Odd Fellow, Satoh
 2004: Before the Blues, Rite of Spring, Baker Fix, Coleman Hawkins, The Patience of Aridity, Waiting for Petrichor
 2003: Heart Song, Syzmanski's Vibraphone Quartet
 2002: Road, Splash, Koto
 2001: The People of the Forest, The Heart's Natural Inclination
 2000: Following the Subtle Current Upstream, Soothing the Enemy, Riley, Tango, In to Get Out
 1999: Shostokovich String Quartet
 1998: Hovering Slightly Above Ground, Who Dressed You Like a Foreigner?, Tarab, Long Straight Line, Map, Land Forms
 1997: String Trio, Suite Etta, Three Stops On the Way Home, Handel Trio
 1996: Klang, Sacred Text, Handel Pas de Deux, Ground
 1995: Signs and Wonders, Rock, String Quartet
 1994: Poulenc Pas de Deux, Ocean, Along the Path
 1993: Bach Cello Suite, Compelling Geological Evidence, Pavane
 1992: Gurdjieff Piano Music
 1991: Song of the Aka, Cante
 1990: Without Wax, Toccatta in D Minor
 1989: Lila, Fallen Angel
 1988: Awake in the Dream, Ligeti Variations, Reoccurrence
 1987: Rain Dreaming, Granados Pas de Deux
 1986: Prayer, Stealing Light
 1983: Ictus

References

External links 

 LINES Ballet – The Propelled Heart featuring Lisa Fischer
 King's LINES Ballet – Scheherazade
 King TED Talk – Stop defining yourself by what you see
 Archival footage of Alonzo King LINES Ballet performing King's Migration  in 2008 at Jacob’s Pillow Dance Festival.

American choreographers
Living people
People from Georgia (U.S. state)
Ballet choreographers
1952 births